In modern physical cosmology, the cosmological principle is the notion that the spatial distribution of matter in the universe is homogeneous and isotropic when viewed on a large enough scale, since the forces are expected to act uniformly throughout the universe, and should, therefore, produce no observable irregularities in the large-scale structuring over the course of evolution of the matter field that was initially laid down by the Big Bang.

Definition
Astronomer William Keel explains:

The cosmological principle is usually stated formally as 'Viewed on a sufficiently large scale, the properties of the universe are the same for all observers.' This amounts to the strongly philosophical statement that the part of the universe which we can see is a fair sample, and that the same physical laws apply throughout. In essence, this in a sense says that the universe is knowable and is playing fair with scientists.

The cosmological principle depends on a definition of "observer", and contains an implicit qualification and two testable consequences.

"Observers" means any observer at any location in the universe, not simply any human observer at any location on Earth: as Andrew Liddle puts it, "the cosmological principle [means that] the universe looks the same whoever and wherever you are."

The qualification is that variation in physical structures can be overlooked, provided this does not imperil the uniformity of conclusions drawn from observation: the Sun is different from the Earth, our galaxy is different from a black hole, some galaxies advance toward rather than recede from us, and the universe has a "foamy" texture of galaxy clusters and voids, but none of these different structures appears to violate the basic laws of physics.

The two testable structural consequences of the cosmological principle are homogeneity and isotropy. Homogeneity means that the same observational evidence is available to observers at different locations in the universe ("the part of the universe which we can see is a fair sample"). Isotropy means that the same observational evidence is available by looking in any direction in the universe ("the same physical laws apply throughout" ). The principles are distinct but closely related, because a universe that appears isotropic from any two (for a spherical geometry, three) locations must also be homogeneous.

Origin 
The cosmological principle is first clearly asserted in the Philosophiæ Naturalis Principia Mathematica (1687) of Isaac Newton. In contrast to earlier classical or medieval cosmologies, in which Earth rested at the center of universe, Newton conceptualized the Earth as a sphere in orbital motion around the Sun within an empty space that extended uniformly in all directions to immeasurably large distances. He then showed, through a series of mathematical proofs on detailed observational data of the motions of planets and comets, that their motions could be explained by a single principle of "universal gravitation" that applied as well to the orbits of the Galilean moons around Jupiter, the Moon around the Earth, the Earth around the Sun, and to falling bodies on Earth. That is, he asserted the equivalent material nature of all bodies within the Solar System, the identical nature of the Sun and distant stars and thus the uniform extension of the physical laws of motion to a great distance beyond the observational location of Earth itself.

Implications 
Since the 1990s, observations have shown that, if one assumes the cosmological principle, then around 68% of the mass–energy density of the universe can be attributed to dark energy, which led to the development of the ΛCDM model.

Observations show that more distant galaxies are closer together and have lower content of chemical elements heavier than lithium. Applying the cosmological principle, this suggests that heavier elements were not created in the Big Bang but were produced by nucleosynthesis in giant stars and expelled across a series of supernovae explosions and new star formation from the supernovae remnants, which means heavier elements would accumulate over time. Another observation is that the furthest galaxies (earlier time) are often more fragmentary, interacting and unusually shaped than local galaxies (recent time), suggesting evolution in galaxy structure as well.

A related implication of the cosmological principle is that the largest discrete structures in the universe are in mechanical equilibrium. Homogeneity and isotropy of matter at the largest scales would suggest that the largest discrete structures are parts of a single indiscrete form, like the crumbs which make up the interior of a cake. At extreme cosmological distances, the property of mechanical equilibrium in surfaces lateral to the line of sight can be empirically tested; however, under the assumption of the cosmological principle, it cannot be detected parallel to the line of sight (see timeline of the universe).

Cosmologists agree that in accordance with observations of distant galaxies, a universe must be non-static if it follows the cosmological principle. In 1923, Alexander Friedmann set out a variant of Albert Einstein's equations of general relativity that describe the dynamics of a homogeneous isotropic universe. Independently, Georges Lemaître derived in 1927 the equations of an expanding universe from the General Relativity equations. Thus, a non-static universe is also implied, independent of observations of distant galaxies, as the result of applying the cosmological principle to general relativity.

Criticism 
Karl Popper criticized the cosmological principle on the grounds that it makes "our lack of knowledge a principle of knowing something". He summarized his position as:
the "cosmological principles" were, I fear, dogmas that should not have been proposed.

Observations 
Although the universe is inhomogeneous at smaller scales, according to the ΛCDM model it ought to be isotropic and statistically homogeneous on scales larger than 250 million light years. However, recent findings have suggested that violations of the cosmological principle exist in the universe and thus have called the ΛCDM model into question, with some authors suggesting that the cosmological principle is now obsolete and the Friedmann–Lemaître–Robertson–Walker metric breaks down in the late universe.

Violations of isotropy 
The cosmic microwave background (CMB) is predicted by the ΛCDM model to be isotropic, that is to say that its intensity is about the same whichever direction we look at. However, recent findings have called the cosmological principle in ΛCDM model into question. Data from the Planck Mission shows hemispheric bias in 2 respects: one with respect to average temperature (i.e. temperature fluctuations), the second with respect to larger variations in the degree of perturbations (i.e. densities). The European Space Agency (the governing body of the Planck Mission) has concluded that these anisotropies are, in fact, statistically significant and can no longer be ignored. Furthermore, evidence from galaxy clusters, quasars, and type Ia supernovae suggests that isotropy is violated on large scales.

Nevertheless, some authors say that the universe around Earth is isotropic at high significance by studies of the cosmic microwave background temperature maps.

Violations of homogeneity
The cosmological principle implies that at a sufficiently large scale, the universe is homogeneous. Based on N-body simulations in a ΛCDM universe, Yadav and his colleagues showed that the spatial distribution of galaxies is statistically homogeneous if averaged over scales of 260/h Mpc or more.

A number of observations have been reported to be in conflict with predictions of maximal structure sizes:
 The Clowes–Campusano LQG, discovered in 1991, has a length of 580 Mpc, and is marginally larger than the consistent scale.
 The Sloan Great Wall, discovered in 2003, has a length of 423 Mpc, which is only just consistent with the cosmological principle.
 U1.11, a large quasar group discovered in 2011, has a length of 780 Mpc, and is two times larger than the upper limit of the homogeneity scale.
 The Huge-LQG, discovered in 2012, is three times longer than, and twice as wide as is predicted possible according to these current models, and so challenges our understanding of the universe on large scales.
 In November 2013, a new structure 10 billion light years away measuring 2000–3000 Mpc (more than seven times that of the SGW) has been discovered, the Hercules–Corona Borealis Great Wall, putting further doubt on the validity of the cosmological principle.
 In September 2020, a 4.9σ conflict was found between the kinematic explanation of the CMB dipole and the measurement of the dipole in the angular distribution of a flux-limited, all-sky sample of 1.36 million quasars.
In June 2021, the Giant Arc was discovered, a structure spanning approximately 1000 Mpc. It is located 2820 MPc away and consists of galaxies, galactic clusters, gas, and dust.

However, as pointed out by Seshadri Nadathur in 2013 using statistical properties, the existence of structures larger than the homogeneous scale (260/h Mpc by Yadav's estimation) does not necessarily violate the cosmological principle in the ΛCDM model (see ).

The homogeneity of the cosmic microwave background over cosmological scales is still a matter of debate.

CMB dipole

As stated above, it is true that the cosmic microwave background provides a snapshot of an isotropic and homogeneous universe. Nevertheless, what is often not advertised is that there is a dipole anisotropy in the cosmic microwave background. The amplitude of the dipole exceeds the amplitudes of the other temperature fluctuations, and for this reason, it is subtracted on the assumption that it is a Doppler effect, or simply due to relative motion. In recent years this assumption has been tested and current results suggest our motion with respect to distant radio galaxies  and quasars  differs from our motion with respect to the cosmic microwave background. The same conclusion has been reached in recent studies of the Hubble diagram of Type Ia supernovae and quasars. This contradicts the cosmological principle and challenges the assumption that the CMB dipole is simply due to relative motion.

This potential misinterpretation of the CMB dipole is hinted at through a number of other observations. First, even within the cosmic microwave background, there are curious directional alignments  and an anomalous parity asymmetry  that may have an origin in the CMB dipole. Separately, the CMB dipole direction has emerged as a preferred direction in studies of alignments in quasar polarizations, scaling relations in galaxy clusters, strong lensing time delay, Type Ia supernovae, and quasars & gamma-ray bursts as standard candles. The fact that all these independent observables, based on different physics, are tracking the CMB dipole direction suggests that the Universe is anisotropic in the direction of the CMB dipole.

Perfect cosmological principle
The perfect cosmological principle is an extension of the cosmological principle, and states that the universe is homogeneous and isotropic in space and time. In this view the universe looks the same everywhere (on the large scale), the same as it always has and always will. The perfect cosmological principle underpins Steady State theory and emerges from chaotic inflation theory.

See also
 Background independence
 Copernican principle
 End of Greatness
 Friedmann–Lemaître–Robertson–Walker metric
 Large scale structure of the cosmos
 Metric expansion of space
 Redshift

References

Physical cosmology
Principles
Concepts in astronomy